Christine Vanparys-Torres (born 1978) is a French handball player, who has played for the French national team. She participated at the 2008 Summer Olympics in China, where the French team placed fifth.

References

External links

1978 births
Living people
French female handball players
Handball players at the 2008 Summer Olympics
Olympic handball players of France